Sehra (Desert) is a 1963 Hindi romantic family drama film directed by V. Shantaram. The story and dialogue writer was Shams Lucknowi, while the screenplay was by Shantaram. Made by Shantaram Productions, it had music composed by Ramlal with lyrics by Hasrat Jaipuri. The actress  Mumtaz played a small character role in this film and also in Shantaram's earlier Stree (1961). The film starred Sandhya, Prashant, Mumtaz, Lalita Pawar, Manmohan Krishan, Ulhas, Babloo, M. Rajan and Baburao Pendharkar.

Krishanrao Vashirde won the Best Cinematography (Colour) Filmfare Awards. This was the first of the two Filmfare awards he won. He was to win again in the same category for Geet Gaya Patharon Ne (1964). He also won the "newly instituted" A. J. Patel Award for Best Colour Cinematography, where he received Rs. 5000 as cash award.

The film, set against the backdrop of Rajasthan, is about a rivalry between two clans and the situation that takes a melodramatic violent turn when the children of the opposing family fall in love.

Plot
Sherpal (Ulhas) and Tailab (Manmohan Krishan) are chiefs of two opposing clans who regularly meet at an annual competition that highlights their combative strengths in fields of weaponry. Sherpal's daughter Angara (Sandhya) is a tomboy who has been taught all that is required for the competition. She defeats Vikram (Prashanth) who is from the clan of Taibal. The two fall in love, but cannot marry due to the old feud. Angara's mother (Lalita Pawar) is after her to behave like a girl and dress accordingly. She finally gives in to her mother's demands. When her father dies, Mangal (M. Rajan) appears claiming to be her betrothed, chosen by her father. When things start taking a violent turn, she agrees to marry him. Mangal then treats her badly after marriage. Angara suffers the humiliation and even carries a heavy weight across the desert, a punishment meted out to her by Mangal. As she trudges through the desert, she comes across a dying Vikram, who asks for water. She attempts to give him water against her husband's wishes, and is shot by Mangal. Angara and Vikram die together.

Cast
 Sandhya as Angara
Prashanth as Vikram
 Manmohan Krishna as Chief Tailab
 Lalita Kumari as Tailab's wife
 Lalita Pawar as Angara's mother
 Baburao Pendharkar
 Babloo
 Ulhas as Chief Sherpal
 Keshavrao Date
 Jeetendra in a small role
 Mumtaz as Juhi
 M. Rajan as Mangal

Crew
The crew for the film consisted of: 
 Producer: V. Shantaram
 Director: V. Shantaram
 Music: Ramlal
 Lyrics: Hasrat Jaipuri
 Editing: V. Shantaram
 Cinematography: Krishnarao Vashirdi
 Art Direction: Kanu Desai
 Make-up: Baba Vardam
 Art: Baburao Jadhav
 Choreographer: Shyam Kumar
 Audiographer: Mangesh Desai

Awards
Filmfare Best Cinematographer Award: Krishnarao Vashirde

Soundtrack
Some of the popular songs of the film were "Taqdeer Ka Fasana" in male and female solos by Lata Mangeshkar and Mohammed Rafi, "Pankh Hote To Ud Aati, Rasiyaa O Zalima" by Lata Mangeshkar, and two duets by Mohammed Rafi and Lata Mangeshkar "Tum To Pyar Ho Sajni" and "Ja Ja Ja Re Tujhe Hum Jaan Gaye". With music direction by Ramlal and lyrics by Hasrat Jaipuri, the playback singers were Lata Mangeshkar, Mohammed Rafi, Asha Bhosle and Hemant Kumar.

Song list

References

External links

Songs - Sehra at Muvyz, Inc.

1963 films
1960s Hindi-language films
Films directed by V. Shantaram